Allan Christensen (30 September 1923 – 8 September 1961) was a Danish sports shooter. He competed in the trap event at the 1952 Summer Olympics.

References

1923 births
1961 deaths
Danish male sport shooters
Olympic shooters of Denmark
Shooters at the 1952 Summer Olympics
Sportspeople from Aarhus